Secretary of State for Employment v Associated Society of Locomotive Engineers and Firemen (No 2) [1972] ICR 19 is a UK labour law case concerning the contract of employment. It held that there is an implied term of good faith in an employment contract, and if the employer withdraws this, it is a breach of contract. The consequence was that in a strike, employees merely "working to rule" needed not to be paid, because they had only partly performed their obligations.

Facts
ASLEF’s members were railway workers. Their industrial action was to comply strictly with the rule book of the British Railways Board. The Secretary of State intervened to get a court order for a ballot of the workforce. ASLEF argued that the criteria of the time, that there was ‘irregular industrial action short of a strike’ was not satisfied, because workers had not breached their contracts.

Judgment
Lord Denning MR held that ‘work to rule’ was a breach because though the rule book was not a contractual document, it was an implied term that the employer's business would not be wilfully obstructed.

Buckley LJ concurred and said it was an implied term to serve the employer faithfully.

Roskill LJ said the implied term was that obedience to lawful instructions should not be carried out so unreasonably that things were disrupted.

See also

UK labour law
Employment contract in English law
Autoclenz Ltd v Belcher [2011] UKSC 41

Notes

References

United Kingdom labour case law
United Kingdom employment contract case law
United Kingdom trade union case law
Court of Appeal (England and Wales) cases
1972 in case law
1972 in British law
Associated Society of Locomotive Engineers and Firemen
Railway litigation in 1972